Asona is one of the eight main Akan clans.

Totem
The totem of the Asona people is the crow or snake.

Major towns
The major towns of the Asona people include;Begoro, New Juaben, Kukurantumi, Akim Tafo etc

References

Ghanaian culture
Akan culture